Abdallah Hamis Ulega (born September 28, 1979) is a Tanzanian politician and a member of the Chama Cha Mapinduzi political party. He was elected MP representing Mkuranga in 2015. Ulega was the Deputy Minister for Livestock and Fisheries and was promoted in February 2023 as the Minister.

References 

1979 births
Living people
Chama Cha Mapinduzi politicians
Tanzanian MPs 2015–2020
Tanzanian MPs 2020–2025